Phytoecia serriventris is a species of beetle in the family Cerambycidae. It was described by Holzschuh in 1984. It is known from Bulgaria.

References

Phytoecia
Beetles described in 1984